Hersony Gadiel Canelón Vera (born 8 December 1988, Caracas) is a male professional track and road cyclist from Venezuela. He won a silver medal for his native country at the 2007 Pan American Games in Rio de Janeiro, Brazil, alongside César Marcano and Andris Hernández in the Men's Track Team Sprint, and won a gold in 2010. He competed in men's track cycling at the 2012 Summer Olympics in London and the 2016 Games in Rio.

Career

2007
  in Pan American Games, Track, Team Sprint, Rio de Janeiro (BRA)
2010
 in Central American and Caribbean Games, Track, Team Sprint, Mayagüez (PUR)
 in Central American and Caribbean Games, Track, Keirin, Mayagüez (PUR)
 in Central American and Caribbean Games, Sprint, Mayagüez (PUR)
 in Pan American Road and Track Championships, Track, Team Sprint, Aguascalientes (MEX)
2011
 in Pan American Games, Track, Sprint, Guadalajara (MEX)
 in Pan American Games, Track, Team Sprint, Guadalajara (MEX)
 in Pan American Games, Track, Keirin, Guadalajara (MEX)
 in Round 2 2011–12 UCI Track Cycling World Cup, Team Sprint, Cali (COL)
 in Round 2 2011–12 UCI Track Cycling World Cup, Keirin, Cali (COL)
2012
 in Pan American Road and Track Championships, Track, Sprint, Mar del Plata (ARG)
 in Pan American Road and Track Championships, Track, Team Sprint, Mar del Plata (ARG)
2013
 in Pan American Road and Track Championships, Track, Team Sprint, Mexico City (MEX)
 in Pan American Road and Track Championships, Track, Flying Lap, Mexico City (MEX)
 in Pan American Road and Track Championships, Track, Sprint, Mexico City (MEX)
 in Venezuelan National Championships, Track, Sprint
 in Venezuelan National Championships, Track, Keirin
 in Copa Cobernador, Sprint, Carabobo (VEN)
 in Copa Cobernador, Keirin, Carabobo (VEN)
 in Round 1 2013–14 UCI Track Cycling World Cup, Keirin, Manchester (GBR)

References
 

1988 births
Living people
Venezuelan male cyclists
Venezuelan track cyclists
Cyclists at the 2007 Pan American Games
Cyclists at the 2011 Pan American Games
Cyclists at the 2012 Summer Olympics
Cyclists at the 2015 Pan American Games
Cyclists at the 2016 Summer Olympics
Cyclists at the 2019 Pan American Games
Olympic cyclists of Venezuela
Sportspeople from Caracas
Pan American Games medalists in cycling
Pan American Games gold medalists for Venezuela
Pan American Games silver medalists for Venezuela
Pan American Games bronze medalists for Venezuela
Medalists at the 2007 Pan American Games
Medalists at the 2011 Pan American Games
Medalists at the 2015 Pan American Games
Medalists at the 2019 Pan American Games
21st-century Venezuelan people
Competitors at the 2010 Central American and Caribbean Games
Competitors at the 2014 Central American and Caribbean Games
Competitors at the 2018 Central American and Caribbean Games